Stephen the Great - Vaslui 1475 is a 1975 Romanian biography film directed by Mircea Drăgan. The film depicts the Battle of Vaslui (1475).

Cast 
 Gheorghe Cozorici - Stephen the Great
 Gheorghe Dinică - Sultan Mehmed II
 Violeta Andrei - Maria of Mangop, Stephen's wife
  - Stanciu, Stephen's advisor
 Sandina Stan - Lady Ilisafta
  - Nobleman Manole Jder
  - Marusca, Daughter of Iatco Hudici 
 Iurie Darie - Nobleman Simion Jder
 Sebastian Papaiani - Nobleman Ionut Jder
 Emanoil Petrut - Orthodox Monk Nicodim
 Ioana Dragan - Candachia
 Florin Piersic - Nobleman Cristea Jder
 Draga Olteanu Matei - Midwife Irina 
 Dina Cocea - Sultana Mara

References

External links 

Romanian biographical drama films
Stephen the Great
Films set in the 1470s
1970s Romanian-language films